Jazz Kings was a group of Ga musicians as the first band dance in Gold Coast.

History 
After the First World War, a group of Ga musicians formed the first band in Gold Coast called the Jazz Kings.

Ghanaian dance bands (1950-1970) 

 ET Mensah and the Tempos
 Black Beats 
 Ramblers
 Uhuru, Broadway 
 Globemasters 
 Rhythm Aces  
 Star Gazers

References 

Highlife
Ghanaian musical groups